Dorothy Theresa Hall (born April 26, 1960) is an American film producer.

Biography
Hall has produced films including The Wedding Banquet (1993), The Incredibly True Adventure of Two Girls in Love (1995), All Over Me (1997), High Art (1998) and 54 (1998). In 1998, Variety named Hall as one of their top ten "Producers to Watch". Also that year, she received the Frameline Award from the San Francisco International Lesbian & Gay Film Festival for her longstanding service to the lesbian and gay community. In 1999 she shared a nomination for an Independent Spirit Award for her work on High Art.

Personal life
Hall is the eldest daughter of late actress Diana Lynn and Mortimer W. Hall, son of publisher Dorothy Schiff. In 2001, she married John Kochman, a vice president at StudioCanal Image whom she met in 1999 while looking for financial backing for The Girl.

Filmography
 1991: Triple Bogey on a Par Five Hole
 1992: Breaking and Entering
 1993: The Wedding Banquet
 1993: Joey Breaker
 1995: The Incredibly True Adventure of Two Girls in Love
 1995: Shao Nu xiao yu
 1996: Johns
 1997: All Over Me
 1997: My Perfect Journey
 1998: High Art
 1998: 54
 1998: Above Freezing
 2000: Wirey Spindell
 2000: Famous
 2000: The Girl
 2002: Tadpole
 2002: Just a Kiss
 2004: Poster Boy
 2005: Daddy, Daddy USA
 2006: Five Fingers

References

External links
 

1960 births
American film producers
American people of German-Jewish descent
Living people
Place of birth missing (living people)
Schiff family